Nyainrong is a small town and seat of Nyainrong County, Nagqu Prefecture, northern Tibet.

Populated places in Nagqu
Township-level divisions of Tibet